The discography of English pop singer Dusty Springfield includes twenty one studio albums, one live album, thirty compilations, four extended plays and sixty-nine singles. Some of Springfield's albums and singles were unreleased, most notably 1974's Longing. Additionally, many of her early US album releases were released by the US arm of Philips Records, using material recorded in England and America with US and UK single releases included and re-ordered. Thus, these album releases were often collections of her recordings that were not intended by Springfield to have been released as proper albums at all. From 1969 on through 2015, her albums were released simultaneously in the US and the UK, though occasionally with different names and artwork, but the same track listings. Only 1968's Dusty... Definitely and 1972's See All Her Faces (both released only in the UK) and 1982's White Heat (released only the US) deviated from that format.

Albums

Studio albums

Live albums

Select compilation albums
Dusty Springfield has released numerous compilations; both official and unofficial. Below is a list of those that have charted on a national chart.

Extended plays
 I Only Want to Be with You (Philips, March 1964) UK #8
 Dusty (Philips, September 1964) UK #3
 Dusty in New York (Philips, May 1965) UK #13
 Mademoiselle Dusty (Philips, July 1965) UK #17
 If You Go Away (Philips, August 1968)
Note: The above chart placements are from the UK EP chart. The EP chart, which was separate from the singles chart and album chart, ran from 1960–1967.

Singles

1960s

1970s

1980s–2000s

Notes

References

External links

Rhythm and blues discographies
Discographies of British artists
Pop music discographies
Soul music discographies